Ragini is a Telugu comedic actress. She made her debut in TV serials aired on Doordarshan. She has acted in 550 serials and 190 Telugu films as a supporting character. She is the sister of Telugu actress Krishnaveni.

Filmography

 Chantabbai (1986)
 Pavitra Bandham (1996)
 Pellichesukundam (1997)
 Dongaata (1997)
 Ganesh (1998)
 Jabili (2001)
 Ashta Chamma (2008)
 Baanam (2009)
 Ee Rojullo (2012)
 Julayi (2012)
 Bhale Bhale Magadivoy (2015)
 Mahanubavudu(2017)

Television

References

External links
 Ragini photos

Telugu comedians
Actresses in Telugu cinema
Indian film actresses
Living people
Indian television actresses
Year of birth missing (living people)
Indian women comedians